The discography of French singer-songwriter Serge Gainsbourg consists of 16 studio albums, 4 live albums, 1 compilation album, 80 singles and EPS, and several soundtrack albums.

Albums

Studio albums

Live albums 
 1980: Enregistrement public au Théâtre Le Palace (re-released in 2006 as Gainsbourg... et cætera – Enregistrement public au Théâtre Le Palace in an expanded edition)
 1986: Gainsbourg Live (Casino de Paris)
 1989: Le Zénith de Gainsbourg
 2009: 1963 Théâtre des Capucines

Compilation albums 
2021: L'ALbum de sa vie (100 titles) (Peak FR: #19, BEL (Wa): #89)

Selected film scores 
 1964: How Do You Like My Sister?
 1967: Anna
 1968: Le Pacha
 1969: Slogan
 1970: Cannabis (instrumental)
 1976: Je t'aime moi non plus – Ballade de Johnny-Jane (instrumental)
 1977: Madame Claude (instrumental)
 1977: Goodbye Emmanuelle (instrumental)
 1980: Je vous aime (only three pieces sung by Gainsbourg)
 1986: Putain de film ! – B.O.F. Tenue de soirée

Editions 
 De Gainsbourg à Gainsbarre (1989, 1994, Philips)
A 207-track survey of Gainsbourg's career from 1959 to 1981 on nine CDs, issued both separately and in a box: Vol. 1 – Le Poinçonneur Des Lilas, 1959-1960; Vol. 2 – La Javanaise, 1961-1963; Vol. 3 – Couleur Café, 1963-1964; Vol. 4 – Initials B.B., 1966-1968; Vol. 5 – Je T'Aime Moi Non Plus, 1969-1971; Vol. 6 – Je Suis Venu Te Dire Que Je M'en Vais, 1973-1975; Vol. 7 – L'Homme à Tête de Chou, 1975-1981; Vol. 8 – Aux Armes et Cætera, 1979-1981; and Vol. 9 – Anna, 1967–1980. A two-CD highlights collection, also called De Gainsbourg à Gainsbarre, was culled from this edition in 1990. The box was reissued in 1994 with two more discs containing the later albums Love on the Beat (1984) and You're Under Arrest (1987).
 Gainsbourg Forever (2001, Mercury)
An 18-CD box issued to mark the tenth anniversary of Gainsbourg's death containing each of his sixteen studio albums and the EP Essais Pour Signature (1958) in its original format (one per CD), plus a disc of rarities, Inédits, Les Archives 1958-1981. A separate 3-CD box, Le Cinéma de Serge Gainsbourg: Musiques de Films 1959–1990 (2001, Mercury) covered his film music.
 Serge Gainsbourg Intégrale (2011, Philips)
A 20-CD, 271-track box issued to mark the twentieth anniversary of Gainsbourg's death. The first sixteen discs contain his studio albums and related tracks. They are followed by a disc of singles, a disc of television and radio recordings, and two discs of film music.

Albums written for other artists 
 1973: Di doo dah – Jane Birkin
 1975: Lolita Go Home – Jane Birkin (about half of the album)
 1977: Rock'n rose – Alain Chamfort
 1978: Ex fan des sixties – Jane Birkin
 1980: Guerre et pets – Jacques Dutronc (about two-thirds of the album)
 1981: Amour année zéro – Alain Chamfort
 1981: Souviens-toi de m'oublier – Catherine Deneuve
 1982: Play blessures – Alain Bashung
 1983: Isabelle Adjani (or Pull marine) – Isabelle Adjani
 1983: Baby Alone in Babylone – Jane Birkin
 1986: Charlotte for Ever – Charlotte Gainsbourg
 1987: Lost Song – Jane Birkin
 1989: Made in China – Bambou
 1990: Amours des feintes – Jane Birkin
 1990: Variations sur le même t'aime – Vanessa Paradis
 Furthermore, several albums by Jane Birkin released after Gainsbourg's death were devoted to Gainsbourg material, including Versions Jane (1996), Arabesque (2002) and Birkin/Gainsbourg : Le Symphonique (2017). Additionally, most Jane Birkin live albums feature almost entirely or entirely Gainsbourg material.

Selected tribute albums and posthumous releases 
 1995: Intoxicated Man (tribute album by Mick Harvey)
 1995: Gainsbourgsion! (tribute album by April March)
 1997: Pink Elephants (tribute album by Mick Harvey)
 1997: Great Jewish Music: Serge Gainsbourg (tribute album)
 1997: Comic Strip (collection of songs recorded between 1966 and 1969)
 2001: I Love Serge: Electronicagainsbourg (remix album)
 2005: Monsieur Gainsbourg Revisited (tribute album)
 2008: Classé X (compilation)
 2008: Gainsbourg Gainbegiratuz (tribute)
 2011: Best of Gainsbourg: Comme Un Boomerang (compilation)
 2016: Delirium Tremens (tribute album by Mick Harvey)
 2017: Intoxicated Women (tribute album by Mick Harvey)
 2020  Serge Vie Heroique (tribute tape by Serge Nikos)

Singles and EPs 
The majority of his EPs (represented in italics) were also released as 7-inch promo jukebox singles.

Notes

Singles written for other artists 
 "Laisse tomber les filles" (1964) – France Gall
 "N’écoute pas les idoles" (1964) – France Gall
 "Les Incorruptibles" (1965) – Petula Clark
 "La Gadoue" (1965) – Petula Clark
 "Poupée de cire, poupée de son" (1965) – France Gall
 "Attends ou va-t'en" (1965) – France Gall
 "Nous ne sommes pas des anges" (1965) – France Gall
 "Baby Pop" (1966) – France Gall
 "Les Sucettes" (1966) – France Gall
 "Les Papillons Noirs" (1966) – Michèle Arnaud
 "Teenie Weenie Boppie" (1967) – France Gall
 "Ne dis rien" (1967) – Anna Karina
 "Comment te dire adieu?" (1968) – Françoise Hardy (lyrics)
 "Betty Jane Rose" (1978) – Bijou
 "Joujou à la casse" (1979) – Alain Chamfort
 "Manureva" (1979) – Alain Chamfort
 "Amour Puissance Six" (1989) – Viktor Lazlo
 "Dis-lui toi que je t'aime" (1990) – Vanessa Paradis
 "White and Black Blues" (1990) – Joëlle Ursull (lyrics by Gainsbourg)

References 

Gainsbourg, Serge